Frederico Burgel Xavier (born 15 January 1986), commonly known as Fred,  is a Brazilian footballer who plays as a central defender for Botafogo PB.

Career
On 12 December 2018, he joined Campeonato Brasileiro Série D side Novo Hamburgo after a spell at Juventude.

Honours
Grêmio
 Copa do Brasil: 2016

Vitória
 Campeonato Baiano: 2017

References

External links
 Fred at FootGoal
 

1986 births
Living people
Sportspeople from Rio Grande do Sul
Brazilian footballers
Association football defenders
Campeonato Brasileiro Série A players
Campeonato Brasileiro Série B players
Campeonato Brasileiro Série C players
Campeonato Brasileiro Série D players
Sport Club Internacional players
Figueirense FC players
Avaí FC players
Associação Desportiva São Caetano players
Esporte Clube Novo Hamburgo players
Sociedade Esportiva e Recreativa Caxias do Sul players
Goiás Esporte Clube players
Grêmio Foot-Ball Porto Alegrense players
Belgian Pro League players
Standard Liège players
F.C.V. Dender E.H. players
Esporte Clube Vitória players
Botafogo Futebol Clube (PB) players
Brazilian expatriate footballers
Brazilian expatriate sportspeople in Belgium
Expatriate footballers in Belgium